PYT or P.Y.T. may refer to:

"P.Y.T. (Pretty Young Thing)", a song by Michael Jackson
P.Y.T. (band), a Florida-based girl group
PYT (Down with Me), an album by P.Y.T.
"P.Y.T. (Pretty Young Thing)", an episode in season 7 of the television show Grey's Anatomy
Pyongyang Time (PYT) (UTC+09:00)

See also

 My PYT (song), a 2016 song by Wale off the album Shine
 
 
 Pretty Young Thing (disambiguation)